Wonder Valley is a 1953 American film starring Gloria Jean.

It was shot in Arkansas in 1951 and is considered a lost film. It is believed to be the first motion picture shot entirely in Arkansas.

Cast
Gloria Jean
Lance Devro
John Fontaine
Walter Kingsford
then-Arkansas Gov. Sid McMath as himself

References

External links
Wonder Valley at IMDb

1953 films
Films shot in Arkansas
Lost American films
1953 drama films
American drama films
1950s lost films
1950s American films